A pure play company focuses solely on a particular product or activity. Investing in a pure play company can be considered as investing in a particular commodity or product of a company.

Pure play firms either specialize in a specific niche, or have little to no vertical integration. For example, a coffee shop may call itself a "pure play" restaurant, and a factory that only produces goods (not designing or selling to consumers) may refer to itself as a pure play manufactory.

E-commerce companies are often referred to as pure play retailers, as they sell only through the Internet.

Pure play method
In finance, the "pure play method" is an approach used to estimate the cost of equity capital  of private companies, which involves examining the  beta coefficient of other public and single focused companies. See also Hamada's equation.

Here,  when estimating a private company A's equity beta coefficient, the equity beta coefficient of a public company B is needed; the latter can be calculated by regressing the return on B's stock on the return on the relevant stock index. The following calculation is then applied to return the beta coefficient of company A.

Unlevered Beta of B = Equity Beta of B / (1 + DEB × (1 − Tax RateB))

Equity Beta A = Unlevered Beta of B × (1 + DEA × (1 − Tax RateA))

where DEA and DEB are the debt to equity ratios of company A and B respectively.

Pure play foundries 
Pure play foundries, such as TSMC and GlobalFoundries, have no in-house design capabilities, and fabricate integrated circuits (ICs) for fabless semiconductor companies, such as Qualcomm, Broadcom, Xilinx, Nvidia, among others. Integrated device manufacturer (IDM) foundries, such as Intel, IBM, NEC, Texas Instruments and Samsung, provide both foundry design services and IC fabrication.

Pure play E-retailers 
Compared to traditional retail stores, pure play e-retailers can serve a wider audience without physical boundaries and distance, and may target specific customer groups without the high cost of obtaining information from these groups.

Compared to companies that integrate both offline and online, pure online internet retails do not have company brand recognition and reputation at the start-up stage, and customers are unable to touch, examine and test real products before buying them. The online shopping experience foregoes human contact with consumers.

Pure play gets physical 

Beginning in 2015, Amazon.com customers in mainland UK with pickup codes can get the order at collection lockers distributed in shopping centers and commercial blocks. Amazon also opened its first physical stores at Purdue University campus in Indiana in 2015.

By 2015, Simply Be had sixteen physical stores.

Net-a-porter Launched a pop up window shop and apply image recognition technology to enable customers to find video content of the clothes and the online shop.

In 2015, Kiddicare, a childcare brand, announced plan to open 12 stores in the UK.

Ocado launched a virtual shopping wall at One New Change, Birmingham's Bullring shopping center and Bristol. Customers can shop by using Ocado's “on the go” app to scan product's barcode on the wall.

eBay opened an inspiration shop in New York in 2011.

See also
 Diversification (strategy)

Further reading

References

Types of business entity